

Events 
Claude Le Jeune comes to Paris and begins to associate with Huguenots.
Richard Farrant is appointed master of the children of St. George's Chapel, Windsor.

Publications
Paolo Aretino – First and second books of responsories for Holy Week (Venice: Francesco Rampazetto)
Bálint Bakfark – First book of lute tablature (Paris: Le Roy & Ballard), contains "several fantasies, motets, chansons, and madrigals" by various composers
Simon Boyleau – Madrigals for four, five, six, seven, and eight voices (Milan: Francesco Moscheni)
Gioseppe Caimo – First book of madrigals for four voices (Milan: Francesco Moscheni)
Claude Goudimel –  for four voices (Paris: Le Roy & Ballard), homophonic harmonizations of the melodies from the 1551 edition of the Genevan Psalter
Philibert Jambe de Fer –  (Lyon: Antoine de Cercia & Pierre de Mia)
Orlande de Lassus
First book of motets for five and six voices (Paris: Le Roy & Ballard)
Fourth book of chansons for four and five voices (Louvain: Pierre Phalèse)
Claude Le Jeune – 10  for four voices (Paris: Le Roy & Ballard)
Francisco Leontaritis – First book of motets for six voices (Venice: Francesco Rampazetto)
Giovanni Domenico da Nola – Second book of madrigals for five voices (Rome: Valerio Salviano & fratelli)
Johannes Pacoloni – Tribus testudinibus ludenda carmina
Annibale Padovano – First book of madrigals for five voices (Venice: Antonio Gardano)
Gioan Paien – First book of madrigals for two voices (Venice: Antonio Gardano)
Giovanni Pierluigi da Palestrina — First book of Motets for four voices (Venice: Antonio Gardano)

Classical music 
Philibert Jambe de Fer – Music for the arrival of King Charles IX of France

Births 
October 26 – Hans Leo Hassler, German composer (died 1612)
date unknown – Kryštof Harant, nobleman, traveller, humanist, soldier, writer and composer (died 1621)

Deaths 
October 5 – Pierre de Manchicourt, composer of the Franco-Flemish School (born c.1510)
date unknown
Jacques Brunel, organist and composer
Purandara Dasa, composer of Carnatic music (born 1484)

References

 
Music
16th century in music
Music by year